The Burning may refer to:
 The Burning (film), a 1981 slasher film
 "The Burning" (Seinfeld), an episode of the American sitcom Seinfeld
 "The Burning", a Civil War military action conducted by Philip Sheridan

Music 
 The Burning (Thunderstone album)
 The Burning (The Crown album), 1995
 The Burning EP by the musical group Ice Nine Kills, 2007

Literature 
 The Burning (play), by Stewart Conn
 The Burning (Doctor Who), a 2000 novel
 Guardians of Ga'hoole: The Burning, a 2004 novel
 The Burning, short story by Jack Cady

See also
 Burning (disambiguation)